De Berk (English: The Birch) is a smock mill in Barger-Compascuum, Netherlands. It was built in 1983.

History

De Berk was originally built c. 1850 at Drantum, Lower Saxony, Germany. It was rebuilt after a fire in 1870. The mill was last worked commercially in 1952. In 1979, the mill was brought to the Netherlands by miller H E A Bokkers, of Overijssel. The mill was erected in the Veenpark, Barger-Compascuum in 1983. It was erected near the site of a mill which had been demolished in 1936. As of summer 2009, the mill is not in full working order, as repairs are required.

Description

De Berk is what the Dutch describe as an "achtkant stellingmolen", an eight-sided smock mill with a stage. It is a two-storey smock mill on a two-storey brick base. The smock and cap are thatched. The wooden windshaft  with a cast-iron poll end carries a brake wheel which has 62 cogs. This drives the wallower at the top of the upright shaft. The wallower has 34 cogs. The great spur wheel, at the lower end of the upright shaft has 100 cogs. This drives the lantern pinion stone nut with 37 staves. The millstones are driven overdrift. They are  diameter.

References

Windmills in Drenthe
Windmills completed in 1983
Grinding mills in the Netherlands
Smock mills in the Netherlands
Octagonal buildings in the Netherlands
Buildings and structures in Emmen, Netherlands